The leone is the currency of Sierra Leone. It is subdivided into 100 cents. As of 1 July 2022, the ISO 4217 code is SLE due to a redenomination of the old leone (SLL) at a rate of SLL 1000 to SLE 1. The leone is abbreviated as Le placed before the amount.

History

The leone was introduced on 4 August 1964. It replaced the British West African pound at a rate of 1 pound = 2 leones (i.e., 1 leone = 10 shillings). When it was introduced, one leone was worth precisely half a pound sterling or US$1.40. The leone was worth more than the U.S. dollar until the 1980s, when the currency started to devalue rapidly. Years of high inflation have caused the value of leone to plummet, and a U.S. dollar became worth thousands of leones starting in the 2000s.

In August 2021, it was announced that a new leone (SLE), worth 1000 SLL, would be introduced. The new leone was eventually introduced in July 2022. Old leone denominations remain legal tender and continue to circulate.

Inflation continues to erode the purchasing power of the leone, averaging over 20% a year. , one U.S. dollar was valued at 16.50 SLE or 16,500 SLL, making the 20 SLE note (the highest circulating denomination) worth only US$1.21.

Coins

First Leone (SLL)
The coins size and compositions were based in part on those of the former colonial state British West Africa. All bore the portrait of the first prime minister of Sierra Leone, Sir Milton Margai. In 1972, 50 cents coins were introduced which carried the portrait of the first president Dr. Siaka Stevens.

In 1974, round cupro-nickel one leone coins were introduced and in 1976, seven sided cupro-nickel 2 leone coins commemorating FAO were introduced. These latter two denominations, however, did not circulate as frequently as the lower cent denominations. In 1987, octagonal, nickel-bronze 1 leone coins were introduced with a bust portrait of General Joseph Saidu Momoh. This coin effectively replaced the one leone note.

Following a period of economic collapse and the following Sierra Leone Civil War inflation became rampant, devaluing older coins. A new coin series was introduced in 1996 for 10, 50 and 100 leones. The 50 leones is octagonal while the other two are round. These coins were struck in nickel-plated steel and feature important figures in Sierra Leone's political history. Ten sided, bimetallic 500 leones coins were first introduced in 2004. Of the four coins in circulation, only the 100 leones is available in small quantity due to their low valuation and shortage of supply.

500 leones coins and the two lowest denominations are rarely encountered due to rampant metal theft in the impoverished country.

Second Leone (SLE)
With the introduction of the new leone, coins were re-issued in denominations of 1, 5, 10, 25, and 50 cents.

Banknotes

First Leone (SLL)
With the introduction of decimal currency in 1964, a new series of Banknotes was introduced by the Bank of Sierra Leone. Originally called Shillings, the unit name "Leone" was finally decided upon. After considering (and subsequently rejecting) several new designs, including a particularly attractive multi-coloured design, notes were issued in the 1, 2 and 5 Leone denominations. These officially replaced notes of the British West African pound at a two leone to one pound exchange ratio. 50 cents notes were introduced in 1979, followed by 10 leones in 1980 and 20 leones notes in 1982. Throughout this period the value of the currency was fixed and remained relatively stable despite inherent economic problems.

100 leones notes were introduced in 1988, followed by 500 leones in 1991, 1000 and 5000 leones in 1993, 2000 leones in the year 2000 and 10,000 Leone in 2004.

The original series of notes (1964-1974) depicted the famous 300 year old Cottonwood Tree and Court building in central Freetown. The reverses showed Diamond Mining (1 Leone), a Village market scene (2 Leones) and the Dockside in Freetown (5 Leones). Subsequent issues (1974-1991) depicted the head of state during the time of issue. The first series depicting Sir Milton Margai and later issues depicting either Siaka and Momoh. This practice ended with the ascension of the NPRC regime and has remained so despite the return to civilian government.

Prior to June 2010, bank notes in circulation were 500, 1000, 2000, 5000 and 10,000 leones. 10,000 leones notes were in circulation for less than ten years and were infrequently encountered. This meant that most transactions took place in bundles of 5000 leones notes.

In June 2010, the Bank of Sierra Leone issued new notes which were slightly smaller in size than the earlier series and intended to be more secure and durable.  The new bank notes are: Le10,000, Le5,000, Le2,000 and Le1,000.  Coins are still used, but because of their low value are less common.

As of 23 Oct 2018, 20,000 leones were equivalent to about 2.09 EUR. As of 19 April 2021, 20,000 leones were equivalent to about 1.62 EUR.

Second Leone (SLE)
Redenominated banknotes in the values of 1, 2, 5, 10, and 20 leones were introduced in 2022, the 20 leones being a new denomination and the 1-10 leones notes maintain the themes and designs of their preceding issues of 1,000-10,000 old leone notes.

Specimen banknotes

Specimen banknotes are issued to banks to familiarize the local inhabitants with any currency changes.

These are issued by Thomas De La Rue of the UK.

See also
 Economy of Sierra Leone

References

External links
banknote serie

Currencies of the Commonwealth of Nations
Currencies of Sierra Leone
Currencies introduced in 1964